"Just Call Me Lonesome" is a song recorded by American country music artist Radney Foster. It was released in July 1992 as the lead single from his debut album Del Rio, TX 1959 and was co-written by Foster and George Ducas. It peaked at No. 10 on the Billboard country music chart in 1992 and was Foster's first release independently of the duo Foster & Lloyd.

Critical reception
A review of the song in Cash Box was positive, stating that "Described as a classic shuffle in the tradition of Ray Price or Buck Owens, 'Just Call Me Lonesome' is also reminiscent of Dwight Yoakam's 'Guitars, Cadillacs'. Good Bakersfield sound."

A review by Billboard said all about Radney and his former part of the duo Foster & Lloyd.

Chart performance

References

1992 debut singles
1992 songs
Radney Foster songs
Songs written by Radney Foster
Songs written by George Ducas (singer)
Arista Nashville singles